The 1982 Bowling Green Falcons football team was an American football team that represented Bowling Green University in the Mid-American Conference (MAC) during the 1982 NCAA Division I-A football season. In their sixth season under head coach Denny Stolz, the Falcons compiled a 7–5 record (7–2 against MAC opponents), won the MAC championship, and outscored their opponents by a combined total of 265 to 199.

The team's statistical leaders included Brian McClure with 1,391 passing yards, Chip Otten with 673 rushing yards, and Shawn Potts with 841 receiving yards.

Schedule

References

Bowling Green
Bowling Green Falcons football seasons
Mid-American Conference football champion seasons
Bowling Green Falcons football